Petr Klíma (born December 23, 1964) is a Czech former professional ice hockey forward.  He played in the National Hockey League for the Detroit Red Wings, Edmonton Oilers, Tampa Bay Lightning, Los Angeles Kings, and the Pittsburgh Penguins.  He also played part of a season with the IHL Cleveland Lumberjacks and two seasons in the Czech league.

Early career and defection
By the time Klíma was 20 years old, officials on his Dukla Jihlava team knew that the Detroit Red Wings were eager to bring the young star to the NHL. Rumors were rampant that the Wings were trying to pay off Czechoslovak authorities to get Klíma out of his native country, but despite all the hype that surrounded him, Czechoslovak hockey authorities made no real effort to clamp down and prevent Klíma from traveling in Europe. As a result, Klíma managed to defect to North America during the summer of 1985, making him the first Czech player to defect directly to a U.S.-based team rather than one of the NHL's Canadian teams which had smuggled several Czechs and Slovaks out of Europe in the past.

Klima's bold move was entirely orchestrated by the Red Wings, who knew that Klíma was eager to play in North America. After his defection was planned, Klíma ditched his Czechoslovak national teammates during a team meal at the Czechoslovak training camp in Nußdorf am Inn, West Germany, to join Wings executive vice-president Jim Lites and assistant coach Nick Polano at an undisclosed location on Aug 18, 1985. Several days were then spent in the effort to bring Klíma to North America, after Lites and Polano, who had flown to Germany on Aug 15, 1985, kept Klíma under wraps in Nussdorf and other cities to avoid pursuit by Czechoslovak police. Polano stayed with Klíma as Lites and other Wings officials arranged for him to gain refugee status to enter the United States. The Wings were assisted by U.S. attorney general Edwin Meese and deputy attorney general Lowell Jensen in expediting the political-asylum process.

It was later revealed that plans to get Klíma out of Czechoslovakia reached back as far as the 1984 World Junior Championships, held in Sweden, when Detroit scout Alex Davidson secretly met with Klíma in December 1983. Klíma told Davidson he would not consider defecting until he had completed his military duty (so as not to be labeled a deserter) in 1985. Less than a year later, at the 1984 Canada Cup, Klíma began talking to the Wings about the possibility of coming to the NHL after the 1984–85 season. During that time, while in Vancouver with the Czechoslovak team, he even signed a secret multiyear contract with the Red Wings. Polano had brought the contract to Klíma without Czechoslovak officials realizing it. Klíma, who spoke no English when he finally arrived in Detroit on Sep 22, 1985, was fortunate that the Red Wings also managed to bring his girlfriend to the U.S. In honor of his successful defection, a grateful and overjoyed Klíma requested sweater number 85 and wore it throughout his NHL career as a reminder of the year in which he gained freedom. Klíma was drafted in the fifth round (88th overall) of the 1983 NHL Entry Draft by the Red Wings.  He played his junior hockey with the CHZ Litvinov team.

NHL playing career

Klíma played four full seasons with the Wings (from 1985 until 1989) before being traded during the 1989–90 season to the Oilers (along with Joe Murphy, Adam Graves, and Jeff Sharples) for Jimmy Carson, Kevin McClelland, and a fifth round draft pick in the 1991 NHL Entry Draft. Klima scored the game-winning goal in the longest Stanley Cup Finals game in history, in the third overtime of Game 1 of the 1990 Finals against Andy Moog of the Boston Bruins despite having not played at all in the third period, nor the first two OT periods. He played for the Oilers until 1993, winning the Stanley Cup in 1990. In 1993 Klima was acquired by the Lightning in exchange for future considerations. Klíma remained with the Lightning for three seasons, until 1996.  He split the 1996–97 season between the Lumberjacks, Kings, Penguins, and Oilers, and was released in 1997.  He played in the DEL in 1997–98, then attempted a comeback with the Red Wings in 1998. He retired from the NHL in 1999, and then played two seasons in years 2001–2003 in the Czech league before retiring for good. He played for Litvinov and captained those 2 years. Asked which jersey number he wanted to wear, Klíma chose the number 85 in recognition of the year of his defection and his first year in the NHL.

Klíma's disciplinary woes

Although he was one of Detroit's bigger stars in the late 1980s, Petr Klíma was also a problem for the Red Wings management. That situation came to a head during training camp on Sep 23, 1988, when Detroit suspended Klíma indefinitely, along with Bob Probert, for breaking team rules. At the time of the suspension, the Wings said they would trade Klíma, although this never happened. The team also said it would not take Klíma back until he had his drinking under control. As a result, Klíma missed the start of the 1988–89 season before being reinstated on Oct. 13, 1988, and sent to Adirondack (AHL) on Oct 16, 1988. He finally made his 1988–89 NHL regular-season debut during Detroit's Nov 6, 1988, game vs. Edmonton where he posted an assist. At his first practice with the team, on Nov 5, 1988, Klíma offered a heartfelt apology to his Wings teammates for his earlier behavior, much of which was alcohol-related. During his months back, Klíma roomed with Probert, who was also trying to cope with his drinking and drug habits. Klíma managed to stay clean, but Probert's substance abuse and subsequent issues would continue for several years.

Personal life
Klíma's sons are also professional ice hockey players. His twin sons Kelly and Kevin signed one-year contracts with the Tucson Roadrunners of the American Hockey League.

Career statistics

Regular season and playoffs

International

Achievements
1989–90 – NHL – Stanley Cup (Edmonton)
1985 – First Czechoslovak born player after the Stastny brothers to defect straight to an NHL team (Detroit Red Wings)

References

External links

1964 births
Adirondack Red Wings players
Cleveland Lumberjacks players
Czech ice hockey left wingers
Czechoslovak ice hockey left wingers
Detroit Red Wings draft picks
Detroit Red Wings players
Grizzlys Wolfsburg players
Edmonton Oilers players
Krefeld Pinguine players
HC Litvínov players
HC Dukla Jihlava players
Living people
Los Angeles Kings players
Sportspeople from Chomutov
Pittsburgh Penguins players
Stanley Cup champions
Tampa Bay Lightning players
PSG Berani Zlín players
Czechoslovak defectors
Czechoslovak expatriate sportspeople in the United States
Czechoslovak expatriate ice hockey people
Czechoslovak expatriate sportspeople in Canada
Czech expatriate ice hockey players in Canada
Czech expatriate ice hockey players in the United States
Czech expatriate ice hockey players in Germany